Cigaritis collinsi is a butterfly in the family Lycaenidae. It is found in Tanzania (from the north-eastern part of the country to the Usambara Mountains).

References

Endemic fauna of Tanzania
Butterflies described in 1980
Cigaritis